Marduk-apla-iddina II (in the Bible Merodach-Baladan, also called Marduk-Baladan, Baladan and Berodach-Baladan, lit. Marduk has given me an heir) was a Chaldean leader from the Bit-Yakin tribe, originally established in the territory that once made the Sealand in southern Babylonia. He seized the Babylonian throne in 722 BC from Assyrian control and reigned from 722 BC to 710 BC, and from 703 BC to 702 BC. His reign is defined by some historians as an illegitimate Third Dynasty of the Sealand, inside of the IXth Dynasty of Babylon, or Assyrian Dynasty.

He was known as one of the kings who maintained Babylonian independence in the face of Assyrian military supremacy for more than a decade.

Sargon of Assyria repressed the allies of Marduk-apla-iddina II in Elam, Aram and Israel and eventually drove (ca. 710 BC) him from Babylon. After the death of Sargon, Marduk-apla-iddina II briefly recaptured the throne from a native Babylonian nobleman. He reigned nine months (703 BC – 702 BC). He returned from Elam and ignited rebellion in Babylonia. He was able to enter Babylon and be declared king again. Nine months later he was defeated near Kish by Sennacherib and the Assyrians, but managed to flee to Elam. He died in exile a couple of years later.

A cylinder of Marduk-apla-iddina II from Uruk describes his rebuilding of the temple of Ningishzida built by the Ur III ruler Shulgi alongside the ziggurat of E-Anna. The cylinder also claims his victory at the Battle of Der in 720 BC, as did Assyrian king Sargon II and also Elamite king Humban-nikash I.

In the Bible
He is mentioned as king of Babylon in the days of King Hezekiah, both in 2 Kings 20:12 (here called Berodach-baladan) and in Isaiah 39:1. In both passages he sends Hezekiah a letter, having heard of his illness and recovery. His messengers who have delivered the letter are lavishly entertained by Hezekiah, leading the prophet Isaiah to criticise Hezekiah for his excessive openness about the wealth he had amassed.

See also
Kings of Babylon
List of biblical figures identified in extra-biblical sources

References

Bibliography
Erich Ebeling (ed.), Bruno Meissner (ed.), Ernst Weidner (ed.), Dietz Otto Edzard (ed.): Reallexikon der Assyriologie und vorderasiatischen Archäologie – Band 7 . Walter de Gruyter 1990, p. 375

702 BC deaths
8th-century BC Babylonian kings
Year of birth unknown
Chaldean kings